3 Andromedae, abbreviated 3 And, is a single star in the northern constellation of Andromeda. 3 Andromedae is the Flamsteed designation. It is visible to the naked eye with an apparent visual magnitude of 4.64. It is moving closer to the Earth with a heliocentric radial velocity of −35 km/s, and has a relatively large proper motion, traversing the celestial sphere at ·yr−1.

This is an evolved giant star with a stellar classification of K0 IIIb, where the 'b' suffix indicated a lower luminosity giant. It is a red clump star, which means it is generating energy through helium fusion at its core. This star has an estimated 1.7 times the mass of the Sun, and, at the age of 2.3 billion years, has expanded to 10 times the Sun's radius. It is radiating 49 times the Sun's luminosity from its enlarged photosphere at an effective temperature of 4,668 K.

References

K-type giants
Horizontal-branch stars
High-proper-motion stars
03 Andromedae
Durchmusterung objects
Andromedae, 03
218031
113919
8760